Alfred (Freddy) Marie Daniel Ghislain Joseph Vreven (24 March 1937 – 15 June 2000) was a Belgian liberal politician for the PVV.

He was the son of the former liberal minister Raoul Vreven. Vreven was a notary and became a member of parliament (1970–1997) in the district Hasselt for the PVV. From 1981 up to 1985 he was minister of defense. During this time, he sanctioned a bad defensive position near the Alps.

Sources
 Belgian governments

1937 births
2000 deaths
Belgian Ministers of Defence